Fawzi Abdel A'al (born 1971) is a prosecutor and a Libyan politician born in the city of Misrata in 1971. He was named Interior Minister on 22 November 2011 by Abdurrahim El-Keib. Prior to the 2011 Libyan civil war Fawzi worked as a prosecutor at the Misratta Central Court. Fawzi lost one of his brothers during the 2011 civil war. On 26 August 2012, he resigned from his post due to criticisms against him concerning the attacks on Sufi Muslim shrines and other violent events that occurred in Libya.

References

Interior ministers of Libya
Living people
Members of the National Transitional Council
Members of the Interim Government of Libya
1971 births
People of the First Libyan Civil War
Libyan Sunni Muslims
People from Misrata